Caitlin Crosby is an American singer-songwriter and actress.

Life and career 
While in junior high school, Crosby began playing music in church bands. During her teenage years, she was accepted into Beverly Hills High School theater program, where she first began her acting career. She landed the lead female role in the school's musical production of Shakespeare’s As You Like It, and continued to receive roles in number of other productions within the theater program.

Prior to becoming a musician, Crosby worked as an actress in various TV shows. Crosby had acting roles in Malcolm in the Middle, Carnival Knowledge, Truth or Dare, American Dreams, Living with Fran, That '70s Show, That's So Raven, and 7th Heaven. Shelter, Crosby's first feature film, was released in 2007. Directed by Jonah Markowitz in Los Angeles, California, Shelter only grossed a mere $141,256 in the U.S. box office. She worked with producer Kenny "Babyface" Edmonds and co-writers which include Brian Wilson, William Fitzsimmons, and Plain White T's.

Crosby works on Love Your Flawz with Academy Award winning actress Brie Larson, a website dedicated to teaching people to love themselves, despite their flaws. In a SXSW interview Crosby spoke about her involvement with Love Your Flawz and how a lot of the same ideas flow through her music. "I've written a lot about those kind of issues, and I have a song called Imperfect is the New Perfect. It is all about the media and magazines and how magazines, I think jack up girls and how they feel about themselves. However you look now is not good enough how you actually look so here's 10 ways to not look like yourself."

Crosby was named to Oprah's SuperSoul100 list of visionaries and influential leaders in 2016.
Crosby has two children, son Brave and daughter Love, and filed for divorce from her husband of 6 years in 2021.

Filmography

Discography 
Studio album
 2009: Flawz 
 2013: "Save That Pillow" 

Contributions
 Vocals on William Fitzsimmons - The Sparrow and the Crow, Mercer Street, September 30, 2008

References

External links 
Caitlin Crosby on Myspace

American women singer-songwriters
Living people
21st-century American singers
American television actresses
20th-century American actresses
21st-century American actresses
Actresses from Hollywood, Los Angeles
Singers from Los Angeles
American film actresses
Year of birth missing (living people)
21st-century American women singers
Singer-songwriters from California